is a Japanese romance visual novel developed by KID for the Dreamcast and the PlayStation. It is the third game in the Memories Off series. The game was released for the Dreamcast and the PlayStation on September 27, 2001. It was later ported to the PlayStation 2 and PlayStation Portable. It was adapted into the first tale of an OVA series, titled as "Memories Off 3.5: Omoide no Kanata e".

Story
Shougo is a lazy university student. He used to have a girlfriend called Kanata Kurosu, but one day she left him and he didn't know anything about her. One day, he meets her at the Cubic Cafe, Shougo's usual relax spot, and a new story beings...

Characters

 (OVA)
The main character. First year student at Chihaya University.

 (OVA & sequels)
Shougo's ex-girlfriend, as she suddenly left him without a trace.

She is a second year student at Chihaya First High. She wants to be a food journalist. Mifu's older sister.

First year student at Chihaya First High, Neo's younger sister. She can't walk so she's confined on wheelchairs. Has a cheerful personality and likes flowers.

First year student at Chihaya University Law Department. Pretty but has a cold attitude.

Nicknamed Nayu. She is a first year student at Chihaya University Arts Department. Loves designing.

A teenage freeter like Shin. She's very true to her feelings.

A 2nd year highschool student. Likes Kenji Miyazawa's Ginga Tetsudou no Yoru.

Often called as Tenchou, he's the owner of a local cafe called Cubic Cafe. Most of the characters are frequent customers in this cafe.

A frequent customer at Cubic Cafe. He's the older brother of a certain someone in Memories Off: Sorekara.

A frequent customer at Cubic Cafe. He grew up in an orphanage. Calls himself a street vendor but his real job is unknown.

The series' recurring character.

Heroine of the first Memories Off. She's studying nursing in Fujikawa Nursing School. A frequent Customer at Cubic Cafe. She makes a cameo in Memories Off: Sorekara.

4th year student in Chihaya University. Koyomi's best friend since high school. A pro-wrestling fan. Marked as a VERY dangerous driver by various people. She was a heroine in Memories Off 2nd.

4th year student in Chihaya University, and Shizuru's best friend since high school. Always refer herself as Beautiful University Student. Like Shizuru, she's a pro-wrestling fan as well. She was one of the heroines in the original Memories Off.

Media

Anime 
You that became a Memory ~Memories Off~ was adapted into the first half of an OVA series, titled as "Memories Off 3.5: Omoide no Kanata e". This OVA adapted Kanata's route in two episodes.

Music 
The opening for all the versions of the game except the PSP port is Replay Machine by Nana Mizuki. The opening for the PSP port is Kimi no Kakera sung by Ayane. This song is also used as the opening for Memories Off: Sorekara.

External links
 SuperLite 2000's You that became a Memory ~Memories Off~ page

2001 video games
Bishōjo games
Dreamcast games
IOS games
Japan-exclusive video games
KID games
Memories Off
PlayStation 2 games
PlayStation Portable games
Romance video games
Video games developed in Japan
Visual novels
Windows games